Marcel Simon (born 20 January 1994) is a German footballer who plays as a defender for VfL Trier.

References

External links
 
 Marcel Simon on FuPa.net

1994 births
Living people
Sportspeople from Aachen
German footballers
Association football goalkeepers
Association football defenders
Alemannia Aachen players
3. Liga players
Footballers from North Rhine-Westphalia